= Thinking Huts =

Nonprofit education organization

Thinking Huts is an American nonprofit organization founded in 2015 that leverages innovative, humanitarian-driven technology to increase global access to education.

== History ==
They began with adding classrooms in Madagascar.

The founder and current CEO, Maggie Grout, was adopted from rural China at a young age.

== Recognition ==
Guidestar, a charity evaluator, awarded Thinking Huts the platinum seal of transparency. Fast Company recognized the nonprofit in 2021 as a World Changing Idea.
